Ali Baba, ou Les quarante voleurs is a tragédie lyrique in four acts plus a prologue, with libretto by Eugène Scribe and Mélesville and music by Luigi Cherubini. The story is based on the tale Ali Baba and the Forty Thieves (One Thousand and One Nights). It was premiered by the Paris Opera in the Salle Le Peletier on 22 July 1833. It was Cherubini's last opera, though he lived for nearly a decade longer. It is also his longest opera, lasting for about three and a half hours at the premiere.

Some of the music was adapted and rewritten from his Koukourgi (written in 1793, but unproduced; first performed in 2010).

Performance history
It was premiered in Paris on 22 July 1833. It was not successful, with Hector Berlioz calling it "one of the feeblest things Cherubini ever wrote". It ran for five performances. Felix Mendelssohn discussed the opera in his letter of 25 December 1834 to Ignaz Moscheles, stating, that Cherubini was so craven to serve the new style envogue in Paris that time.

It was resurrected by La Scala in 1963, but again faced negative reviews. A live recording was made and was subsequently issued.

The overture has found a place in the concert repertoire for symphony orchestras.

Roles

Synopsis

Nadir is in love with Delia, the daughter of wealthy merchant Ali Baba, but desperate to marry her because he is poor. Ali Baba has promised Delia to the head collector Aboul-Hassan. However, Nadir found a treasure hidden in a cave by a gang of robbers and asks for Delia's hand. Ali Baba wants to know the secret of Nadir's wealth and is led to the cave, where it remains trapped and is captured by the thieves. While the robbers have taken possession of a load of bales of coffee Ali Baba was smuggling, Aboul-Hassan, furious at the thought of not being able to have Delia, kidnapped her. The robbers then ask a ransom to release Ali Baba and try to storm the house of the merchant hiding in bales of coffee. The situation seems to change for the worse for Nadir and his men, but Aboul-Hassan and his soldiers come and order that the bales be burned and the leaders of the gang arrested.

Releases

1963: Wladimiro Ganzarolli (Alì Babà), Teresa Stich-Randall (Delia), Orianna Santunione (Morgiane), Alfredo Kraus (Nadir), Paolo Montarsolo (Aboul-Hassan), Piero de Palma (Calaf), Lorenzo Testi (Ours-Kan), Agostino Ferrin (Thamar), Virgilio Carbonari (Phaor). Conductor: Nino Sanzogno. Orchestra and chorus of La Scala – live recording – LP: E. J. Smith The Golden Age of Opera EJS 393; Mauro R. Fuguette MRF C 05; Melodram MEL 170. CD: Nuova Era 2361/2

Notes

Further reading

External links
 

Operas by Luigi Cherubini
Works based on Ali Baba
French-language operas
1833 operas